Leuze-en-Hainaut is a city and municipality of Wallonia located in the province of Hainaut, Belgium. 

On 1 January 2018, it had a population of 13,886.

The municipality consists of the following districts: Blicquy, Chapelle-à-Oie, Chapelle-à-Wattines, Gallaix, Grandmetz, Leuze-en-Hainaut, Pipaix, Thieulain, Tourpes, and Willaupuis.

Famous landmarks
 The Collegiate Church of Saint Peter was erected in 1745 on the site of a former Gothic church, destroyed by fire. The building's sumptuous interior features intricate woodwork, including the carved Louis XVth style panels of the confessionals, decorated with a variety of motifs, a sculpted representation of Saint Peter in chains, below the pulpit, and the organ casing.

Twin towns
 - Loudun (France) (1961)
 - Ouagadougou Burkina Faso (1968)
 - Carencro, Louisiana (United States) (1993)

See also
 Brasserie à vapeur

References

External links
 

Cities in Wallonia
Municipalities of Hainaut (province)
Nervii